The Sozh Floating Bridge is a pontoon bridge spanning the Sozh River at Korma, Belarus.  It was built in 2003–2004, and carries light automobile traffic.

Bridges in Belarus
Pontoon bridges